Cyamops freidbergi is a species of fly.

References

freidbergi
Insects described in 2000